Marwanids may refer to:

 Marwanids (Diyar Bakr), a Kurdish dynasty that ruled in Diyar Bakr in the 10th–11th centuries
 Marwanids, a branch of the Umayyad dynasty that ruled as caliphs from 684 to 750